Kingdom of Croatia may refer to:

 Kingdom of Croatia (925–1102), an independent medieval kingdom
 Croatia in personal union with Hungary (1102–1526), a kingdom in personal union with the Kingdom of Hungary
 Kingdom of Croatia (Habsburg) (1527–1868), part of the Lands of the Habsburg Monarchy
 Kingdom of Croatia-Slavonia (1868–1918), an autonomous kingdom under Hungary within Austria-Hungary
 Independent State of Croatia (1941–1945), a puppet state during World War II, formally a kingdom until 1943

See also
 Croatia (disambiguation)
 Croatian (disambiguation)